Rennell Sound is a sound off the west coast of Graham Island in Haida Gwaii, a coastal archipelago of the North Coast region of British Columbia, Canada (also known as the Queen Charlotte Islands).

See also
Rennell Island

References

Graham Island
Sounds of British Columbia